The Revenge Group (Persian: گروه انتقام, Gorooh-e Entegham) also known as Anjoman were an underground nationalist guerrilla group mainly active around 1941 to 1947 in Tehran, Iran.

See also
Pan-Iranist Party of Iran
Iranian nationalism

Rebel groups in Iran
Iranian nationalism